The volleyball competition at the 2017 Games of the Small States of Europe was held at the Palestra A. Casadei, Serravalle from 30 May to 3 June 2017. The beach volleyball competition was held at special stage inside the Stadio di Baseball di Serravalle from 30 May to 2 June 2017.

Medalists

Men

Indoor

|}

|}

Beach

Pool A

|}

|}

Pool B

|}

|}

7th place match

|}

5th place match

|}

Semifinals

|}

Bronze medal match

|}

Gold medal match

|}

Women

Indoor

|}

|}

Beach

|}

|}

References

External links
Beach volleyball results
Volleyball results
Beach Volleyball – Results book
Volleyball – Results book

2017 Games of the Small States of Europe
Games of the Small States of Europe
2017
Volleyball in San Marino